The 1983 Cork Junior Hurling Championship was the 86th staging of the Cork Junior Hurling Championship since its establishment by the Cork County Board. The championship began on 25 September 1983 and ended on 6 November 1983.

On 6 November 1983, St. Catherine's won the championship following a 1–13 to 1–08 defeat of Aghabullogue in the final at Páirc Uí Chaoimh. It was their first ever championship title.

Qualification

Results

Quarter-finals

Semi-finals

Final

Championship statistics

Top scorers

Overall

In a single game

References

Cork Junior Hurling Championship
Cork Junior Hurling Championship